Futbol Club Barcelona is a professional association football club based in Barcelona, Catalonia, Spain. Founded by a group of Swiss, German, English and Catalan footballers led by Joan Gamper, the club has become a symbol of Catalan culture and Catalanism, hence the motto "Més que un club" (More than a club). The official Barça anthem is the "Cant del Barça", written by Jaume Picas and Josep Maria Espinàs. Unlike many other football clubs, the socis, who are the members and supporters of the club, own and operate Barcelona. It is the world's fourth richest football club in terms of revenue, with an annual turnover of €582.1 million in the 2020–21 season.

Barcelona played its first friendly match on 8 December 1899 against the English colony in Barcelona in the old velodrome in Bonanova. Initially, Barcelona played against other local clubs in various Catalan tournaments. In 1929, the club became one of the founding members of La Liga, Spain's first national league, and has since achieved the distinction of being one of only three clubs to have never been relegated, along with Real Madrid and Athletic Bilbao. Barcelona is also the only European club to have played continental football every season since 1955. They hold a long-standing rivalry with Real Madrid, with matches between the two teams referred to as "El Clásico" (El Clàssic in Catalan). Matches against city rivals Espanyol are known as the "Derbi barceloní".

Barcelona has amassed various records in regional, domestic and continental tournaments since its founding. During the time the club played in regional competitions until the end of the Catalan championship in 1940, it won a record 23 titles from a possible 38. In 2009, Barcelona achieved an unprecedented sextuple by winning La Liga, the Copa del Rey, the UEFA Champions League, the Supercopa de España, the UEFA Super Cup and the FIFA Club World Cup in one calendar year. Additionally, Barça has won the coveted continental treble, consisting of La Liga, the Copa del Rey and the UEFA Champions League in the aforementioned 2009 and again 2015, becoming the first European club to have won the treble twice.

Barcelona has signed several high-profile players, setting the world record in transfer fees on three occasions with the purchase of Johan Cruyff from Ajax in 1973, Diego Maradona from Boca Juniors in 1982 and Ronaldo from PSV Eindhoven in 1996. The club's players have received seven FIFA World Player of the Year awards, twelve Ballon d'Or awards, three UEFA Men's Player of the Year awards and eight European Golden Shoe awards.

Honours 
FC Barcelona won their first trophy in 1902 when they lifted the Copa Macaya, which was the predecessor to the Catalan Championship. The club won the Catalan Championship a record 23 times during the 40-year span of the tournament.

When the national league was established in 1929, the importance of the regional league declined, and it was abandoned in 1940. From then on, Barcelona did not participate in regional competitions until the establishment of the Copa Catalunya in 1993, a cup they have won a record nine times.

They are the most successful football club in Spain, having won a total of 76 domestic titles: 26 La Liga, a record 31 Copa del Rey, a record 14 Supercopa de España, a record three Copa Eva Duarte and a record two Copa de la Liga.

The club is also one of the most successful clubs in international club football, having won 22 official trophies in total, 14 of which are UEFA competitions and 8 recognised by FIFA. Barcelona has won five UEFA Champions League titles, a record four UEFA Cup Winners' Cup titles, a record three Inter-Cities Fairs Cup titles (non-UEFA), a shared record of two Latin Cup titles, a shared record of five UEFA Super Cup titles and three FIFA Club World Cup titles. They are also second to Real Madrid in terms of overall official titles 98–99.

Regional titles (34) 
 Campionat de Catalunya:

 Winners (23) (record):

 Copa Messi  (1): 1902

 Copa Barcelona (1): 1903

 Campionat de Catalunya (21): 1904–05, 1908–09, 1909–10, 1910–11, 1912–13, 1915–16, 1918–19, 1919–20, 1920–21, 1921–22, 1923–24, 1924–25, 1925–26, 1926–27, 1927–28, 1929–30, 1930–31, 1931–32, 1934–35, 1935–36, 1937–38

 Runners-up (5):
 Copa Macaya (1): 1901
 Campionat de Catalunya (4) : 1907–08, 1911–12, 1932–33, 1936–37

 Liga Catalana:
 Winners  (1) (record): 1937–38

 Catalan Cup:
 Winners (8) (record): 1990–91, 1992–93, 1999–2000, 2003–04, 2004–05, 2006–07, 2012–13, 2013–14
 Runners-up (10): 1995–96, 1996–97, 1997–98, 2000–01, 2001–02, 2005–06, 2007–08, 2009–10, 2010–11, 2015–16

 Supercopa de Catalunya:
 Winners (2) (record): 2014, 2018
 Runners-up (2): 2016, 2019

Domestic titles (76) 
 La Liga:

 Winners (26): 1929, 1944–45, 1947–48, 1948–49, 1951–52, 1952–53, 1958–59, 1959–60, 1973–74, 1984–85, 1990–91, 1991–92, 1992–93, 1993–94, 1997–98, 1998–99, 2004–05, 2005–06, 2008–09, 2009–10, 2010–11, 2012–13, 2014–15, 2015–16, 2017–18, 2018–19

 Runners-up (27): 1929–30, 1945–46, 1953–54, 1954–55, 1955–56, 1961–62, 1963–64, 1966–67, 1967–68, 1970–71, 1972–73, 1975–76, 1976–77, 1977–78, 1981–82, 1985–86, 1986–87, 1988–89, 1996–97, 1999–2000, 2003–04, 2006–07, 2011–12, 2013–14, 2016–17, 2019–20, 2021–22

 Copa del Rey:

 Winners (31) (record):

 1909–10: 3–2 vs. Club Español de Madrid

 1911–12: 2–0 vs. R. S. Gimnástica Española

 1912–13: 2–1 vs. Real Sociedad

 1919–20: 2–0 vs. Athletic Bilbao

 1921–22: 5–1 vs. Real Unión

 1924–25: 2–0 vs. Getxo

 1925–26: 3–2 vs. Atlético Madrid

 1927–28: 3–1 vs. Real Sociedad

 1941–42: 4–3 vs. Athletic Bilbao

 1950–51: 3–0 vs. Real Sociedad

 1951–52: 4–2 vs. Valencia

 1952–53: 2–1 vs. Athletic Bilbao

 1956–57: 1–0 vs. Espanyol

 1958–59: 4–1 vs. Granada

 1962–63: 3–1 vs. Zaragoza

 1967–68: 1–0 vs. Real Madrid

 1970–71: 4–3 vs. Valencia

 1977–78: 3–1 vs. Las Palmas

 1980–81: 3–1 vs. Sporting Gijón

 1982–83: 2–1 vs. Real Madrid

 1987–88: 1–0 vs. Real Sociedad

 1989–90: 2–0 vs. Real Madrid

 1996–97: 3–2 vs. Real Betis

 1997–98: 1–1 vs. Mallorca (5–4 pen.)

 2008–09: 4–1 vs. Athletic Bilbao

 2011–12: 3–0 vs. Athletic Bilbao

 2014–15: 3–1 vs. Athletic Bilbao

 2015–16: 2–0 vs. Sevilla

 2016–17: 3–1 vs. Alavés

 2017–18: 5–0 vs. Sevilla

 2020–21: 4–0 vs. Athletic Bilbao

 Runners-up (11):

 1918–19: 2–5 vs. Getxo

 1931–32: 0–1 vs. Athletic Bilbao

 1935–36: 1–2 vs. Real Madrid

 1953–54: 0–3 vs. Valencia

 1973–74: 0–4 vs. Real Madrid

 1983–84: 0–1 vs. Athletic Bilbao

 1985–86: 0–1 vs. Zaragoza

 1995–96: 0–1 vs. Atlético Madrid

 2010–11: 0–1 vs. Real Madrid

 2013–14: 1–2 vs. Real Madrid

 2018–19: 1–2 vs. Valencia

 Copa de la Liga:

 Winners (2) (record):

 1982–83: 4–3 (2–2 / 2–1) vs. Real Madrid

 1985–86: 2–1 (1–0 / 2–0) vs. Real Betis

 Supercopa de España:

 Winners (14) (record):

 1983: 3–2 (3–1 / 0–1) vs. Athletic Bilbao

 1991: 2–1 (0–1 / 1–1) vs. Atlético Madrid

 1992: 5–2 (3–1 / 1–2) vs. Atlético Madrid

 1994: 6–5 (0–2 / 4–5) vs. Zaragoza

 1996: 6–5 (5–2 / 3–1) vs. Atlético Madrid

 2005: 4–2 (0–3 / 1–2) vs. Real Betis

 2006: 4–0 (0–1 / 3–0) vs. Espanyol

 2009: 5–1 (1–2 / 3–0) vs. Athletic Bilbao

 2010: 5–3 (3–1 / 4–0) vs. Sevilla

 2011: 5–4 (2–2 / 3–2) vs. Real Madrid

 2013: 1–1 (1–1 / 0–0) vs. Atlético Madrid

 2016: 5–0 (0–2 / 3–0) vs. Sevilla

 2018: 2–1 vs. Sevilla

 2022–23: 3–1 vs. Real Madrid

 Runners-up (11):
 1985: 2–3 (3–1 / 1–0) vs. Atlético Madrid

 1988: 2–3 (2–0 / 2–1) vs. Real Madrid

 1990: 1–5 (0–1 / 4–1) vs. Real Madrid

 1993: 2–4 (3–1 / 1–1) vs. Real Madrid

 1997: 3–5 (2–1 / 4–1) vs. Real Madrid

 1998: 1–3 (2–1 / 0–1) vs. Mallorca

 1999: 3–5 (1–0 / 3–3) vs. Valencia

 2012: 4–4 (3–2 / 2–1) vs. Real Madrid

 2015: 1–5 (4–0 / 1–1) vs. Athletic Bilbao

 2017: 1–5 (1–3 / 0–2) vs. Real Madrid

 2020–21: 2–3 vs. Athletic Bilbao

 Copa Eva Duarte: (the forerunner to the Supercopa de España)

 Winners (3) (record):

 1948: 1–0 vs. Sevilla

 1952: Was given without a play-off match as Barcelona won both the Spanish Cup and La Liga

 1953: Was given without a play-off match as Barcelona won both the Spanish Cup and La Liga

 Runners-up (2):

 1949: 4–7 vs. Valencia

 1951: 0–2 vs. Atlético Madrid

European titles (19) 
 European Cup / UEFA Champions League:

 Winners (5):

 1991–92: 1–0 vs. Sampdoria

 2005–06: 2–1 vs. Arsenal

 2008–09: 2–0 vs. Manchester United

 2010–11: 3–1 vs. Manchester United

 2014–15: 3–1 vs. Juventus

 Runners-up (3):

 1960–61: 2–3 vs. Benfica

 1985–86: 0–0 vs. Steaua București (0–2 on penalties)

 1993–94: 0–4 vs. Milan

 UEFA Cup Winners' Cup:

 Winners (4) (record):

 1978–79: 4–3 vs. Fortuna Düsseldorf

 1981–82: 2–1 vs. Standard Liège

 1988–89: 2–0 vs. Sampdoria

 1996–97: 1–0 vs. Paris Saint-Germain

 Runners-up (2):

 1968–69: 2–3 vs. Slovan Bratislava

 1990–91: 1–2 vs. Manchester United

 Inter-Cities Fairs Cup: (the forerunner to the UEFA Cup)

 Winners (3) (record):

 1955–58: 8–2 (2–2 / 6–0) vs. London XI

 1958–60: 4–1 (0–0 / 4–1) vs. Birmingham City

 1965–66: 4–3 (0–1 / 2–4) vs. Zaragoza

 Runners-up (1):

 1961–62: 3–7 (6–2 / 1–1) vs. Valencia

 Inter-Cities Fairs Cup Trophy Play-Off:

 1971: (2–1) vs. Leeds United

 Latin Cup:

 Winners (2) (shared record):

 1949: 2–1 vs. Sporting CP

 1952: 1–0 vs. Nice

 UEFA Super Cup:

 Winners (5) (shared record):

 1992: 3–2 (1–1 / 2–1) vs. Werder Bremen

 1997: 3–1 (2–0 / 1–1) vs. Borussia Dortmund

 2009: 1–0 vs. Shakhtar Donetsk

 2011: 2–0 vs. Porto

 2015: 5–4 vs. Sevilla

 Runners-up (4):

 1979: 1–2 (1–0 / 1–1) vs. Nottingham Forest

 1982: 1–3 (1–0 / 3–0) vs. Aston Villa

 1989: 1–2 (1–1 / 1–0) vs. Milan

 2006: 0–3 vs. Sevilla

Worldwide titles (3) 
 FIFA Club World Cup:

 Winners (3):

 2009: 2–1 vs. Estudiantes

 2011: 4–0 vs. Santos

 2015: 3–0 vs. River Plate

 Runners-up (1):

 2006: 0–1 vs. Internacional

 Intercontinental Cup: (the forerunner to the FIFA Club World Cup)

 Runners-up (1):

 1992: 1–2 vs. São Paulo

Doubles and trebles 
 Doubles

 La Liga and Copa del Rey doubles (8) (record):

 1951–52, 1952–53, 1958–59, 1997–98, 2008–09 (as part of treble), 2014–15 (as part of treble), 2015–16, 2017–18

 La Liga and European Cup doubles (5) (record):

 1991–92, 2005–06, 2008–09 (as part of treble), 2010–11 and 2014–15 (as part of treble)

 Copa del Rey and UEFA Cup Winner's Cup double (1):

 1996–97

 Trebles

 La Liga, Copa del Rey and Champions League trebles (2) (shared record):

 2008–09
 2014–15

Others titles (89) 
 Liga Mediterránea:

 Winners (1) (record):

1937 (Barça is considering application to the Royal Spanish Football Federation (RFEF) to make this equivalent to a La Liga title, after learning that the RFEF considered to recognize Levante FC's Copa de la España Libre of the same year as equivalent to Copa del Rey. The RFEF later denied Levante their request.).

 Copa de Oro Argentina: (Unofficial event prior to the Copa Eva Duarte)

 Winners (1) (record):
 
 1945: 5–4 vs. Athletic Bilbao

 Pyrenees Cup:

 Winners (4) (record):

 1910: 2–1 vs. Real Sociedad

 1911: 4–0 vs. Gars Bordeaux FC

 1912: 5–3 vs. Stade Bordelais Université Club

 1913: 7–2 vs. Comète Simotes Bordeaux

Teresa Herrera Trophy

 Winners (5):

1948, 1951, 1972, 1990, 1993

Orange Trophy:

 Winners (1):

1961

 Pequeña Copa del Mundo de Clubes:

 Winners (1):
 1957

 "Historical" tournament (Torneo de los “históricos”):

 Winners (1) (record):

1948

Joan Gamper Trophy:

 Winners (45) (record):

1966, 1967, 1968, 1969, 1973, 1974, 1975
1976, 1977, 1979, 1980, 1983, 1984, 1985
1986, 1988, 1990, 1991, 1992, 1995, 1996
1997, 1998, 1999, 2000, 2001, 2002, 2003
2004, 2006, 2007, 2008, 2010, 2011, 2013
2014, 2015, 2016, 2017, 2018, 2019, 2020
2021,2022,

Mohammed V Trophy:

Winners (1):

1969

Ramón de Carranza Trophy:

Winners (3):

1961, 1962, 2005

Trofeo Ciudad De Palma:

 Winners (5):

1969, 1974, 1979, 1981, 1986

Trofeo Costa del Sol:

Winners (1):

1977

Ciutat de Barcelona trophy:

 Winners (1):

1989

Trofeo Ciudad de Alicante:

 Winners (1):

1987

Festa d'Elx Trophy:

Winners (3):

1970, 1989, 2003

Trofeo Ciudad de La Línea:

Winners (3):

1985, 1991, 1995

Trofeo Ciudad de Oviedo:

Winners (1):

1996

Trofeo Ciudad de Marbella:

Winners (1):

1993

Ciutat de Lleida Trophy:

Winners (1):

1998

Amsterdam Tournament:

Winners (1):

 2000

Memorial Artemio Franchi:

Winners (1):

2008

Summer of Champions' Cup:

Winners (1):

2012

Tournoi de Paris:

Winners (1):

2012

Trofeo Colombino:

Winners (1):

2014

Qatar Airways Cup 2016:

 Winners (1):

2016

International Champions Cup:

 Winners (1):

 2017

Audi Cup:

 Winners (1):

 2011

LaLiga-Serie A Cup:

 Winners (1):

 2019

 Players records 
 Most appearances 

 All competitions As of match played 19 March 2023 Top goalscorers 
 All competitions As of match played 16 May 2021 Most goals scored for a single club in all official competitions (World Record): 672 –  Lionel Messi, 2004–2021
 Most goals scored in El Clásico: 26 –  Lionel Messi, 2004–2021
 Most goals scored in Derbi barceloní: 25 –  Lionel Messi, 2004–2021
 Most goals scored in one season in all official competitions: 73 –  Lionel Messi, 2011–12
 Most goals scored in one calendar year (Guinness World Records): 91 (96 goals including club friendlies) –  Lionel Messi, 2012
 Most goals scored in one game: 9 –  Joan Gamper, on three occasions, 1901–1903
 Most home goals scored in one season in all competitions: 46 –  Lionel Messi, 2011–12
 Most goals scored from a free kick in official competitions: 50 –  Lionel Messi, 2004–2021
 Most hat-tricks in all competitions overall: 48 –  Lionel Messi, 2004–2021
 Fastest hat-trick: 9 minutes (34th, 41st, 43rd) –  Pedro, against Getafe, 2013–14
 Most goals scored in Joan Gamper Trophy: 9 –  Lionel Messi, 2004–2021

 International competitions As of match on played 16 February 2021 Most goals scored in FIFA Club World Cup (World Record): 5 –  Lionel Messi, 2004–2021,  Luis Suárez, 2014–2020
 Most goals scored in UEFA Champions League: 120 –  Lionel Messi, 2004–2021
 Most goals scored in the group stage of UEFA Champions League (UCL Record): 71 –  Lionel Messi, 2004–2021
Most goals scored in UEFA Cup: 11 –  Carles Rexach, 1972–1981
 Most goals scored in UEFA Super Cup: 3 –  Lionel Messi, 2004–2021
 Most goals scored in Intercontinental Cup: 1 –  Hristo Stoichkov, 1992
 Most goals scored in UEFA Cup Winners' Cup: 10 –  Hans Krankl, 1978–1981
 Most goals scored in Inter-Cities Fairs Cup: 19 –  José Antonio Zaldúa, 1961–1971
 Most goals scored in one UEFA Champions League season: 14 –  Lionel Messi, 2011–12
 Most goals scored in one UEFA Champions League game (UCL Record): 5 –  Lionel Messi, against Bayer Leverkusen in 2011–12

 La Liga As of match played 16 May 2021 Most goals scored in La Liga: 474 (La Liga Record) –   Lionel Messi, 2004–2021
 Most goals in one La Liga season: 50 (La Liga Record) –  Lionel Messi, 2011–12.
 Most home goals in one La Liga season: 35 (La Liga Record) –  Lionel Messi, 2011–12.
 Most away goals in one La Liga season: 24 (La Liga Record) –  Lionel Messi, 2012–13.
 Most matches scored in one La Liga season: 27 (La Liga Record) –  Lionel Messi, 2012–13.
 Most goals scored in one La Liga game: 7 (La Liga Record) –  László Kubala, against Sporting Gijón in 1951–52.
 Most braces in La Liga: 126 (La Liga Record) –  Lionel Messi, 2004–2021
 Most La Liga hat-tricks in one season: 8 (La Liga Record) –  Lionel Messi in 2011–12.
 Most La Liga hat-tricks overall: 36 (La Liga Record) –    Lionel Messi, 2004–2021.
 Longest scoring run in La Liga: 33 goals, 21 games (La Liga Record) –  Lionel Messi, 2012–13.
 Longest scoring run in La Liga away: 13 games (La Liga Record) –  Lionel Messi, 2012–13.
 Most home goals scored in club history in La Liga: 278 (La Liga Record) –  Lionel Messi, 2004–2021
 Most away goals scored in Barcelona history in La Liga: 196 (La Liga Record) –  Lionel Messi, 2004–2021
 Most home matches scored in one La Liga season: 16 (La Liga Record) –  Lionel Messi, 2011–12.
 Most away matches scored in one La Liga season: 15 (La Liga Record) –  Lionel Messi, 2012–13.
 Most opponents scored in one La Liga season: 19 (La Liga Record) –  Ronaldo, 1996–97 (42 games),  Lionel Messi, 2012–13 (38 games).
 Most goals scored as coming on as a substitute in La Liga: 25  (La Liga Record) -  Lionel Messi, 2004–2021
 Most assists in La Liga: 233 (La Liga Record) –  Lionel Messi, 2004–2021

 Copa del Rey As of match played 18 April 2021 Most goals scored in Copa del Rey: 65 –  Josep Samitier, 1919–1932.
 Most goals scored in one Copa del Rey game: 7 –  Eulogio Martínez, against Atlético Madrid in 1956–57.
 Most goals scored in one Copa del Rey season: 21 –  Josep Samitier, 1927–28.
 Most goals scored in Copa de la Liga: 4 –  Raúl Vicente Amarilla, 1985–86.
 Most goals scored in Supercopa de España: 14 (Supercopa de España Record) –  Lionel Messi, 2004–2021

 Goalkeepers records 

 Barcelona players that have won the Zamora trophy for best goalkeeper in La Liga.  Antoni Ramallets and  Víctor Valdés are the goalkeepers that have won the trophy five times for Barcelona:
 Juan Zambudio Velasco: (1) 1947–48
 Antoni Ramallets: (5) 1951–52, 1955–56, 1956–57, 1958–59, 1959–60
 José Manuel Pesudo: (1) 1965–66
 Salvador Sadurní: (3) 1968–69, 1973–74, 1974–75
 Miguel Reina: (1) 1972–73
 Pedro María Artola: (1) 1977–78
 Javier Urruticoechea: (1) 1983–84
 Andoni Zubizarreta: (1) 1986–87
 Víctor Valdés: (5) 2004–05, 2008–09, 2009–10, 2010–11, 2011–12
 Claudio Bravo: (1) 2014–15
 Longest period without conceding a goal:
 Víctor Valdés went 896 minutes without conceding a goal in all competitions in the 2011–12 season (from the 22nd minute of the 5th game to the 20th minute of the 12th game). Six games of the Spanish League and three Champions League games were played without conceding a goal.
 Miguel Reina went 824 minutes without conceding a goal in the Spanish League in the 1972–73 season (from the 53rd minute of the 14th game to the 67th minute of the 23rd game).
 Most clean sheets:
 Víctor Valdés played 535 official games of which he maintained a clean sheet in 237 games, or 44.3% of the matches. The former record was held by  Andoni Zubizarreta who played 410 official games of which he maintained a clean sheet in 173 games, or 42.2% of the matches.
 Most clean sheets in a season: 
33 in 2014–15: 23 kept by  Claudio Bravo (all in La Liga), 10 kept by  Marc-André ter Stegen 6 in Champions League and 4 in Copa del Rey.
 Most cleen sheets registered by a keeper in a La Liga season: 
23 kept by  Claudio Bravo in 2014–15.
 Goalkeeper with best average goals conceded in history: 
 Víctor Valdés in 2010–11 with an average of 0.50 goals (16 goals in 32 games).
 Best unbeaten start:
754 minutes by  Claudio Bravo in 2014–15.

 Players' individual honours and awards while playing with Barcelona 

 Barcelona players that have won the FIFA World Player of the Year/Best FIFA Men's Player:
 Romário (1): 1994
 Ronaldo (1): 1996
 Rivaldo (1): 1999
 Ronaldinho (2): 2004, 2005
 Lionel Messi (2): 2009, 2019
 Barcelona players that have won the France Football'' Ballon d'Or or FIFA Ballon d'Or for best player in Europe/the world:
 Luis Suárez (1): 1960
 Johan Cruyff (2): 1973, 1974
 Hristo Stoichkov (1): 1994
 Rivaldo (1): 1999
 Ronaldinho (1): 2005
 Lionel Messi (7): 2009, 2010, 2011, 2012, 2015, 2019, 2021
 Barcelona players that have won the UEFA Club Footballer of the Year or UEFA Men's Player of the Year Award:
 Ronaldinho (1): 2006
 Lionel Messi (3): 2009, 2011, 2015
 Andrés Iniesta (1): 2012
 Barcelona players that have won either the Best Defender, Midfielder or Forward award at UEFA Club Football Awards:
 Carles Puyol (1): 2006
 Deco (1): 2006
 Ronaldinho (1): 2006
 Samuel Eto'o (1): 2006
 Xavi (1): 2009
 Lionel Messi (2): 2009, 2019
 Frenkie de Jong (1): 2019
 Barcelona players that were included in the FIFA FIFPRO World 11:
 Lionel Messi (15),  Andrés Iniesta (9),  Xavi (6),  Dani Alves (6),  Gerard Piqué (4),  Ronaldinho (3),  Carles Puyol (3),  Samuel Eto'o (2),  Neymar (2),  Gianluca Zambrotta (1),  Lilian Thuram (1),  David Villa (1),  Luis Suárez (1),  Frenkie de Jong (1)
 Barcelona players that were included in the UEFA Team of the Year:
 Lionel Messi (12),  Andrés Iniesta (6),  Carles Puyol (6),  Xavi (5),  Gerard Piqué (5),  Ronaldinho (3),  Dani Alves (3),  Samuel Eto'o (2),  Patrik Andersson (1),  Gianluca Zambrotta (1),  Zlatan Ibrahimović (1),  David Villa (1),  Eric Abidal (1),  Neymar (1),  Frenkie de Jong (1)
 Barcelona players that have received an IFFHS Men's World Team award:
 Lionel Messi (5),  Neymar (1),  Frenkie de Jong (1)
 Barcelona players that have won the European Golden Shoe:
 Ronaldo (1996–97, 34 goals in 37 games)
 Lionel Messi (2009–10, 34 goals in 35 games; 2011–12, 50 goals in 37 games; 2012–13, 46 goals in 32 games; 2016–17, 37 goals in 34 games; 2017–18, 34 goals in 35 games; 2018–19, 36 goals in 34 games)
 Luis Suárez (2015–16, 40 goals in 35 games)
 Barcelona players that have won the Pichichi Trophy:
 Mariano Martín (1942–43, 32 goals in 23 games)
 César Rodríguez (1948–49, 28 goals in 24 games)
 Cayetano Ré (1964–65, 25 goals in 30 games)
 Carles Rexach (1970–71, 17 goals in 28 games)
 Hans Krankl (1978–79, 29 goals in 30 games)
 Quini (1980–81, 20 goals in 30 games; 1981–82, 26 goals in 32 games)
 Romário (1993–94, 30 goals in 33 games)
 Ronaldo (1996–97, 34 goals in 37 games)
 Samuel Eto'o (2005–06, 26 goals in 35 games)
 Lionel Messi (2009–10, 34 goals in 35 games; 2011–12, 50 goals in 37 games; 2012–13, 46 goals in 32 games; 2016–17, 37 goals in 34 games; 2017–18, 34 goals in 35 games; 2018–19, 36 goals in 34 games; 2019–20, 25 goals in 33 games; 2020–21, 30 goals in 35 games)
 Luis Suárez (2015–16, 40 goals in 35 games)
 Barcelona players that have been the top scorer of Copa del Rey:
 Rivaldo (1997–98, 8 goals)
 Javier Saviola (2006–07, 7 goals)
 Lionel Messi (2008–09, 6 goals in 8 games; 2010–11, 7 goals in 6 games; 2013–14, 5 goals in 6 games; 2015–16, 5 goals in 5 games; 2016–17, 5 goals in 7 games)
 Neymar (2014–15, 7 goals in 6 games)
 Luis Suárez (2015–16, 5 goals in 4 games)
 Munir El Haddadi (2015–16, 5 goals in 5 games)
 Barcelona players that have been the top scorer of UEFA Champions League:
 Ronald Koeman (1993–94, 8 goals in 12 games)
 Rivaldo (1999–2000, 10 goals in 14 games)
 Lionel Messi (2008–09, 9 goals in 12 games; 2009–10, 8 goals in 11 games; 2010–11, 12 goals in 13 games; 2011–12, 14 goals in 11 games; 2014–15, 10 goals in 13 games; 2018–19, 12 goals in 10 games)
 Neymar (2014–15, 10 goals in 12 games)
 Barcelona players that have been the top scorer of FIFA Club World Cup:
 Adriano (2011, 2 goals in 1 game)
 Lionel Messi (2011, 2 goals in 2 games)
 Luis Suárez (2015, 5 goals in 2 games)

 Other individual records for the club 

 Barcelona players that have won the most trophies:
 Lionel Messi (35)
 Barcelona players that have won the most Spanish League trophies:
 Lionel Messi (10): 2004–05, 2005–06, 2008–09, 2009–10, 2010–11, 2012–13, 2014–15, 2015–16, 2017–18, 2018–19
 Barcelona players that have won the most Spanish Cup trophies: 
 Lionel Messi,  Sergio Busquets,  Gerard Piqué (7): 2008–09, 2011–12, 2014–15, 2015–16, 2016–17, 2017–18, 2020–21
 Barcelona players that have won the most UEFA Champions League trophies:
 Xavi,  Andrés Iniesta,  Lionel Messi (4): 2005–06, 2008–09, 2010–11, 2014–15
 Barcelona player with most UEFA Champions league final appearances:
 Andrés Iniesta (4): 2006, 2009, 2011, 2015
 Players with most consecutive wins in La Liga:
 Sergio Busquets with 25 wins between Ligas 2009–10 and 2010–11.
 Players with most consecutive games without losing in a league game:
 Andrés Iniesta with 55 games (47 wins and 8 draws) from the 0–2 against Hércules in week 2 of the 2010–11 season to the 1–2 defeat against Real Madrid in week 35 of the 2011–12 season.
 Youngest player to appear for the club:
 Paulino Alcántara (15 years, 4 months and 18 days).
 Youngest player to score for the club:
 Paulino Alcántara (15 years, 4 months and 18 days).
 Youngest player to score for the club in La Liga:
 Ansu Fati (16 years and 304 days).
 Youngest player to start in the first team for the club in La Liga:
 Ansu Fati (16 years and 318 days).
 Youngest player to score and assist for the club in La Liga:
 Ansu Fati (16 years and 318 days)(La Liga record).
 Youngest player to score for the club in Camp Nou history:
 Ansu Fati (16 years and 318 days).
 Youngest player to score a brace for the club in La Liga:
 Ansu Fati (17 years and 94 days)(La Liga record).
 Youngest player to score for the club in UEFA Champions League:
 Ansu Fati (17 years and 40 days)(Champions League record).
 Youngest player to score and assist for the club in UEFA Champions League:
 Ansu Fati (17 years and 355 days).
 Most assists provided in all official competitions (World Record): 292  –   Lionel Messi, 2004–2021
 Player to have scored most goals as coming on as a substitute in all competitions: 
 Lionel Messi (34)
 Players to have scored a hat-trick in UEFA Champions League:
 Lionel Messi (8) (shared record) Arda Turan (1)
 Neymar (1)
 Rivaldo (1)
 Ronaldinho (1)
 Samuel Eto'o (1)
 Robert Lewandowski (1)
 Player to have scored in seven different official competitions in one calendar year: 
 Lionel Messi, 2015, in the La Liga, Copa del Rey, UEFA Champions League, Copa América, UEFA Super Cup, Spanish Super Cup and FIFA Club World Cup, completed on 20 December 2015.
 Players to have scored in six different official club competitions in one season:
 Pedro, 2009–10, in the Copa del Rey, La Liga, UEFA Champions League, Spanish Super Cup, UEFA Super Cup and FIFA Club World Cup, completed on 16 December 2009.
 Lionel Messi, 2011–12, in the Copa del Rey, La Liga, UEFA Champions League, Spanish Super Cup, UEFA Super Cup and FIFA Club World Cup, completed on 4 January 2012 and 2015–16, in the Copa del Rey, La Liga, UEFA Champions League, Spanish Super Cup, UEFA Super Cup and FIFA Club World Cup, completed on 6 January 2015.
 Player to have both scored and assisted in six different official club competitions in one calendar year:
 Lionel Messi, 2011, in the La Liga, Copa del Rey, UEFA Champions League, Spanish Super Cup, UEFA Super Cup and FIFA Club World Cup, completed on 18 December 2011.
 Most goals scored in a single season by an offensive trio in Spanish football history:131 goals, scored by  Lionel Messi,  Neymar and  Luis Suárez in 2015–16, completed on 22 May 2016.
 Most goals scored in a La Liga season by an offensive trio:90 goals, scored by  Lionel Messi,  Neymar and  Luis Suárez in 2015–16

 Managerial records 

 First full-time manager:  John Barrow.
 Most seasons as coach:  Jack Greenwell, nine years in two spells from 1917 to 1924 and from 1931 to 1933.
 Most consecutive seasons as coach:  Johan Cruyff, managed the club for eight years between 1988 and 1996.
 Most matches undefeated in a La Liga season: 37  Pep Guardiola in 2009–10 season and  Ernesto Valverde in 2017–18 season 
 Most consecutive matches undefeated in a La Liga season: 36  Ernesto Valverde, between Matchdays 1 and 34 (matchday 34 was played after matchday 36) in 2017-18 season 
 Most consecutive away matches undefeated in a La Liga season: 16  Pep Guardiola, between 29 August 2010 (Matchday 1) and 23 April 2011 (Matchday 33) in 2010-11 season 
 Most consecutive away matches won in La Liga: 10  Pep Guardiola, between 29 August 2010 (Matchday 1) and 29 January 2011 (Matchday 21) in 2010-11 season 
 Most trophies won as coach:  Pep Guardiola, 14 titles out of 19 possible between August 2008 and May 2012.
 Coaches who won the treble:
 Pep Guardiola in 2008–09.
 Luis Enrique in 2014–15.

 Coaches individual awards while coaching Barcelona 

 Barcelona coaches that have won the FIFA World Coach of the Year award:
 Pep Guardiola: (1) 2011
 Luis Enrique: (1) 2015
 Barcelona coaches that have won the IFFHS World's Best Club Coach award:
 Frank Rijkaard: (1) 2006
 Pep Guardiola: (2) 2009, 2011
 Luis Enrique: (1) 2015

 Team records 
Barcelona's team records include the following:

 La Liga 

 Points 

 Most points in a season:
 100 points in the 2012–13 season (La Liga record).
 The team with most points at the end of the first half of the league:
 55 points during the 2012–13 season (La Liga record).
 The team with most points at the end of the second half of the league:
 50 points during the 2009–10 season.
Maximum difference over the runner up: 
 15 points over Real Madrid in the 2012–13 season (La Liga record).

 Goals 

 Most away goals scored in a League season:
 52 goals scored in the 2012–13 season.
 Season with the best goal difference in a League season:
 +89 in 2014–15 season. 
 Season with most goals scored in League matches:
 In 2016–17 season, the club scored a total number of 116 goals in 38 games.
 Season with fewest goals scored in League matches:
 The club scored a total number of 32 goals in 22 games in the 1939–40 season.
 First Spanish team to score in all away games in a La Liga season:
 In 2010–11 season, 19 games
 Season with fewest goals conceded in League matches:
 The club conceded a total number of 18 goals in 30 games in the 1968–69 season.
The club conceded a total number of 21 goals in 38 in the 2010–11 season.
 Season with most goals conceded:
 The club conceded a total number of 66 goals in 26 games in the 1941–42 season.
 Most goals scored in a calendar year – all competitions: 
 180 goals in 2015

 Streaks 

 Consecutive La Liga titles:
 Won 4 championship titles: 1990–91, 1991–92, 1992–93, 1993–94 seasons.
 Longest consecutive unbeaten matches in La Liga (record):
 43 games, 2016–17 and 2017–18 season.
 Longest consecutive unbeaten matches at home in La Liga:
 67 games from game 25 of 1972–73 season to game 21 1976–77 season.
 Longest consecutive unbeaten matches away from home in La Liga (record):
 23 games (14 February 2010 to 30 April 2011)
Longest consecutive unbeaten matches in La Liga from first game:
 36 first games of 2017–18 season.
 Longest winning run in La Liga (joint record):
 16 games in the 2010–11 season.
 Longest winning run at home in La Liga:
 39 games between game 22 of the 1957–58 season to game 8 of the 1960–61 season.
 Longest winning run in away matches in La Liga:
 12 games (1 May 2010 to 12 February 2011)
 Longest consecutive scoring in La Liga (record):
 72 games (4 February 2012 to 19 October 2013)
 Longest consecutive scoring at home in La Liga:
 88 games between game 22 of the 1951–52 season to game 18 of the 1957–58 season.
 Longest consecutive scoring in away matches in La Liga (record):
 26 games, from game 35 (1 May 2010) of the 2009–10 season until game 12 (6 November 2011) of the 2011–12 season.
 Most consecutive wins and best away start in La Liga (record):
 10 victories in the 2010–11 season.
 Biggest home win in La Liga:
 Won 10–1 over Gimnàstic de Tarragona in 1949–50.
 Biggest away win in La Liga (record):
 0–8 over Las Palmas  in 1959–60.
 0–8 over Almería in 2010–11.
 0–8 over Córdoba in 2014–15.
 0–8 over Deportivo La Coruña in 2015–16.
 Biggest defeat in La Liga:
 Lost 12–1 to Athletic Bilbao in 1930–31.
 Most consecutive matches as leader of La Liga:
 59 matchdays (from matchday 1 of the 2012–13 season to matchday 21 of the 2013–14 season).

 International 

 Only team to have appeared in every year of the continental competition:
 Barcelona has participated since the inception in 1955.
 Highest win in European competitions at home games:
 8–0 over Apollon Limassol (Cyprus) in 1982 and 8–0 over Púchov (Slovakia) in 2003.
 Highest win in European competition at away games:
 0–7 over Hapoel Be'er Sheva (Israel) in the 1995–96 UEFA Cup.
 Most consecutive wins in the UEFA Champions League:
 11 wins during the 2002–03 season.
 Most goals in a UEFA Champions League season:
 45 goals during the 1999–2000 season.
 Most FIFA World Cup Golden Balls won by the players from a single club:4 –  Johan Cruyff won in 1974,  Romário in 1994, and  Lionel Messi in 2014 and 2022.
 Most FIFA Club World Cup Golden Balls won by the players from a single club:4 – Deco (won in 2006),  Lionel Messi (won in 2009 and 2011), and  Luis Suárez (won in 2015).
 Most FIFA/France Football Ballons d'Or won by the players from a single club:12 –  Lionel Messi (won in 2009, 2010, 2011, 2012, 2015 and 2019),  Johan Cruyff (won in 1973 and 1974),  Luis Suárez (won in 1960),  Hristo Stoichkov (won in 1994),  Rivaldo (won in 1999), and  Ronaldinho (won in 2005).
 Most European Golden Shoe awards won by the players from a single club:8 –  Ronaldo (won in 1997),  Lionel Messi (won in 2010, 2012, 2013, 2017, 2018 and 2019), and  Luis Suárez (won in 2016).
 Only team that have been represented by final three contenders at a FIFA Ballon d'Or Gala:
 In 2010, the final three contenders were Barcelona players  Lionel Messi,  Andrés Iniesta and  Xavi.
 Only team of which youth academy has been represented by final three contenders at a FIFA Ballon d'Or Gala:
 In 2010, the final three contenders were Barcelona youth academy players  Lionel Messi,  Andrés Iniesta and  Xavi.
 Only team that have collected all the awards (Golden Boot, Golden Ball, Silver Ball, Bronze Ball and Fair Play award) at a single FIFA Club World Cup:
 In 2015,  Luis Suárez won the Golden Ball and the Golden Boot,  Lionel Messi won the Silver Ball,  Andrés Iniesta won the Bronze Ball and Barcelona was awarded the Fair Play award.

 All competitions 
 First ever team to win the treble twice in Europe:
 Barcelona won the Spanish Cup, Spanish League and the UEFA Champions League in 2008–09 and in 2014–15.
 Year with most titles:
 Only Spanish football team to ever win six titles in a year and completing the sextuple by winning (in 2009): Spanish Cup, Spanish League, European Cup, Spanish Super Cup, European Super Cup and FIFA Club World Cup.
 Team with most Spanish titles: 109.
 Spanish club with most official titles: 124.
 Season with most titles (Spanish football record):
 Five championship titles in 1951–52: La Liga, Copa del Rey, the Latin Cup, Copa Eva Duarte and Copa Martini & Rossi.
 Biggest win in any competition:
 18–0, in the Copa Macaya: Tarragona 0–18 Barcelona in 1901.
 Biggest win in a Friendly match:
 20–1, Smilde (Netherlands) 1–20 Barcelona in 1992.
 Longest unbeaten run in all competitive matches:
 39 games in the 2015–16 season 
 Longest winning run in competitive matches:
 19 games in both domestic and international matches during the 2005–06 season: 13 in the league, 3 in the Champions League, 2 in the Spanish cup and 1 in the Catalan Cup.
 Most consecutive away wins:
 13 games during the 2008–09 season: 8 in the league, 3 in the Champions League and 2 in the Copa del Rey (also a Spanish football record).
 Longest scoring run in all competitions:
 44 games: 36 in league between game 9 (22 November 1942) of the 1942–43 season and game 18 (6 February 1944) of the 1943–44 season, and 8 Cup games in 1943.
 2nd most goals in a season – all competitions:
 190 in the 2011–12
 Most goals scored by players from the youth system:
 Of the 190 goals scored in the 2011–12 season, 150 were scored by players from Barcelona's youth system (also a Spanish football record).
 Most scorers in official matches in a season:
 In the 2010–11 season, 23 Barcelona players scored at least one goal in official competitions (also a Spanish football record).
 Most victories in a season: 
 50 in the 2014–15 season, out of a possible 60 games (also a Spanish Football record).
 Most matches unbeaten by a Spanish team – all competitions: 
 34 in the 2015–16 season
 Most consecutive away wins: 
 13''' games during the 2008–09 season.

Transfer fee paid 

Notes

Transfer fee received 

Notes

See also 
 List of FC Barcelona seasons

References 
Notes

Citations

External links 
 

Records And Statistics
Barcelona
Records